Aramide is a Nigerian Afro-soul singer and songwriter. She won Best Vocal Performance (Female) for "Iwo Nikan" at the Headies 2015. She graduated with a political science degree from the University of Jos.

In 2019, Aramide was appointed by The Recording Academy to the board of governors for the Washington, D.C. chapter of the Academy.

Life and career

Personal life
Aramide is married and has a child. Her traditional marriage and white wedding were held on 18 April 2015 in her hometown, Ibadan.

Music career and breakthrough single
Aramide's music quest started in 2006, when she contested on ‘Star Quest’ one of Nigeria's most prestigious and competitive music talent hunt shows. Her band did very well in the competition as they were judged the 3rd Runners Up. In 2008, she was a part of a show called ‘Divas Unplugged’ in the famous city of Jos in Nigeria; the show had all the leading female artistes in the Nigerian music industry and her participation in this show was very challenging and rewarding, and her performance and involvement was very inspirational. On September 9, 2014 she got signed to Baseline Music after exiting from Trybe Records.

Iwo Nikan
On February 4, 2015 Aramide released her first single under Baseline Music, "Iwo Nikan", which ended up not just being a single but a breakthrough for her and the label Baseline Music. She won Best Vocal Performance for the same song "Iwo Nikan" at The Headies Award 2015.

Musical influence and genres
Aramide's music is influenced by Erykah Badu, Miriam Makeba, Sade, and Angélique Kidjo. Aramide fuses soul and jazz with African music to depict her sound. She performs in Yoruba and English, and is known for her style, which she calls Afro-Soul.

Suitcase
Aramide's debut album Suitcase was released November 22, 2016. It features guest appearances from Sound Sultan, Ice Prince, Adekunle Gold, Koker and Sir Dauda. The album was produced by Cobhams, Laitan Dada, Sizzle Pro and Tintin.

Aramide Suitcase Live (ASL)
Aramide embarked on a debut tour and showcased her album in the United States, Ghana, Nigeria, Canada and other countries. The tour was titled "Aramide Suitcase Live" (ASL).

Songversation With Aramide (SWA)
Songversation With Aramide is an initiative of Afro-Soul/Jazz musician Aramide. The event, which is in its second year, is held annually to mark the International Women's Day through the promotion of positive narratives for Nigerian women.

As a concert-style event, it blends music with topical conversation to motivate women to take the lead, foster personal development and gain societal recognition. The event, also celebrates the achievements of women who have made impact in the unique fields.

With featured performances from Aramide and other artistes, the event highlights the power of music in championing the goals of women.

Notable Performances and Songs
She has been performing in several popular events and shows since she rose to stardom in United Kingdom, Canada, Dubai, Nigeria, Ghana etc.:

As lead artist
List of Aramide's singles as lead artist before debut Album 

Her single "I Don’t Care" was spotted on number 1 spot on MTN Yhello Top 10 Nigeria Chart, number 4 on Alternative Music Naija Chart on Top Radio 90.9 FM and number 3 on Alternative Nigeria Chart on Radio Continental 102.3FM. Also "Love Me" picked on number 1 spot on Alternative Nigerian Chart on The Beat 99.9 FM and on number 3 spot on Playdata Chart.

As Featured artist

Cover

Awards and nominations

References

Living people
Yoruba women musicians
21st-century Nigerian women singers
People from Ibadan
Yoruba-language singers
English-language singers from Nigeria
Nigerian women singer-songwriters
University of Jos alumni